Mylochromis guentheri is a species of cichlid endemic to Lake Malawi where it is found over sandy substrates.  This species can reach a length of  TL.  This species can also be found in the aquarium trade. The specific name honours the German-born British zoologist, ichthyologist, and herpetologist Albert Günther (1830-1914).

References

guentheri
Taxa named by Charles Tate Regan
Fish described in 1922
Taxonomy articles created by Polbot